Forecast: Tomorrow is a 3-CD/1-DVD career-spanning compilation of recordings of Weather Report. The 37 tracks are presented chronologically, beginning with three tracks pre–Weather Report, from ensemble duties with Miles Davis (both Zawinul and Shorter), Cannonball Adderley (Zawinul), and from a Shorter solo album. In addition to two previously unreleased tracks, the set closes with DJ Logic's remix of "125th Street Congress".

The 4th disc in the package is a 2-hour DVD of a concert in Offenbach am Main, on September 28, 1978 for the German TV program Rockpalast. The boxed set includes a 100-page book with notes on the set by compiler Bob Belden, a long essay on the band by Hal Miller, and a reminiscence of the 1978 concert by drummer Peter Erskine.

CD Track listing

Personnel for the Offenbach Concert
Josef Zawinul - keyboards
Wayne Shorter - saxophones
Jaco Pastorius - bass
Peter Erskine - drums

DVD Track listing 
 "Black Market" (Zawinul)
 "Scarlet Woman" (Johnson/Zawinul/Shorter)
 "Young and Fine" (Zawinul)
 "The Pursuit of the Woman With the Feathered Hat" (Zawinul)
 "A Remark You Made" (Zawinul)
 "River People" (Pastorius)
 "Thanks for the Memories" (Rainger/Robin)
 "Delores/Portrait of Tracy/Third Stone from the Sun" (Shorter)/(Pastorius)/(Hendrix)
 "Mr. Gone" (Zawinul)
 "In a Silent Way" (Zawinul)
 "Waterfall" (Zawinul)
 "Teen Town" (Pastorius)
 "I Got It Bad and That Ain't Good/The Midnight Sun Will Never Set on You" (Ellington/Webster)/(Burke/Hampton/Mercer)
 "Birdland" (Zawinul)
 "Introductions"
 "Fred & Jack" (Erskine)
 "Elegant People" (Shorter)
 "Badia" (Zawinul)

References 

Weather Report albums
Albums produced by Bob Belden
2006 compilation albums
Jazz fusion compilation albums
2006 live albums
Live video albums
2006 video albums
Columbia Records compilation albums